Cannabis in West Virginia is illegal for recreational use. Possession of small amounts is a misdemeanor crime. Medical use was legalized through legislation passed in 2017.

Medical cannabis
Medical cannabis bills were introduced in West Virginia in each year between 2010 and 2015, when West Virginia Senate Bill 546 and West Virginia House Bill 2909 sought to legalize marijuana for medical use, but failed to advance prior to the end of the legislative session on 14 March.

In 2017, Senate Bill 386 was passed, legalizing medical cannabis for specific chronic medical conditions. Governor Justice signed it into law on April 19, 2017, and it went into effect in July 2018. However, dhhr.wv.gov states it wasn't until July 1, 2019, that effects of the law would allow the state to "issue the patient and caregiver identification cards necessary to obtain medical cannabis."

References

West Virginia
Crime in West Virginia
West Virginia culture